Hopea mesuoides is a tree in the family Dipterocarpaceae, native to Borneo. The specific epithet mesuoides refers to the species' resemblance to the genus Mesua.

Description
It has flying (detached) buttresses and stilt roots. The bark is smooth.

Distribution and habitat
Hopea mesuoides is endemic to Borneo.

References

mesuoides
Endemic flora of Borneo
Plants described in 1967
Taxonomy articles created by Polbot